The International Institute for Justice and the Rule of Law, also referred to as The IIJ or Malta Institute, is an International body, which aims to improve governance within underdeveloped countries, with its main focus on counter-terrorism. The IIJ was founded in 2014 by twelve founding nations and is based in Valletta, Malta. It is often referred to as a Global Counter-Terrorism Forum inspired institution. The founding nations include the Netherlands, United Kingdom, France, the United States and the EU. It also partnered with a number of International federations, such as the United Nations and the EU.

Since 2014, the IIJ has focused on improving rule of law within Africa and also the Middle East. Its main objective is to train justice sector practitioners and also minimise terrorism in the regions.

History
In June 2014, it was announced that the International Institute for Justice and the Rule of Law (IIJ) would open in Valletta, Malta. The institute is closely supported by the Global Counterterrorism Forum and the United Nations. The IIJ was conceived during meetings by Ministers and senior officials of the Global Counterterrorism Forum, an organisation of about 40 countries from around the globe. It was founded by twelve founding member nations, with the help of institutions such as the EU and the United Nations. The nations included Algeria, France, Italy, Jordan, Malta, Morocco, the Netherlands, Nigeria, Tunisia, Turkey, United Kingdom, and the United States. The IIJ was referred to as a "Global Counterterrorism Forum inspired institution" at the time of its foundation and is often compared to two similar institutions, Hedayah and GCERF.

At the meeting where the IIJ's foundation was announced, partners and representatives from founding members signed the Valletta Declaration on the International Institute for Justice and the Rule of Law Foundation. Some of the partners who signed the declaration included the International Centre for Counter-Terrorism (ICCT), the Global Center on Cooperative Security (GCCS) and the Institute for Security Studies (ISS).

After the foundation of the IIJ, it became clear that its main focus is counter-terrorism. While the IIJ undertakes a variety of roles, the majority of its programs are closely linked to counter-terrorism. It aims to provide support to lawmakers, police, prosecutors, judges, and similar personnel on how to deal with challenges and terrorism within their regions and borders. One such example is how counter terrorism laws could be implemented and how rule of law can promote and improve societies within certain regions, by promoting justice, security and human rights. The IIJ at the time planned to play an influential role in supporting African and Middle Eastern countries that were in a period of transition.

After the Institution opened, it held its inaugural support and training session. The two-day event brought together prosecutors and investigators who discussed how to deal with terrorist cells in the Sahel and Maghreb. The focus was on how to stem the flow of foreign fighters joining ISIS' fight in Syria from the two African regions. Following the inaugural event, a number of workshops were scheduled, including the United Nations Office on Drugs and Crime (UNODC) work with building legal cooperation between Libya and other North African countries to stem the funding of terrorism.

In late 2014, the University of Malta and the IIJ announced that they had signed a Memorandum of Understanding (MOU) to promote their aims to advance peace and security. The MOU will result in a collaboration between the two parties on research and training, while expertise will also be shared.

By the second anniversary, over a thousand professionals, including lawmakers, police and judges had received training or support from the IIJ. This support continued their original strategy of addressing terrorism and minimising criminal activity.

Operations
Malta was chosen as the home for the Institute and is the location that training and support will take place. Its geographical location is centralised to provide support between Europe, the Middle East and also Africa. While the twelve founding nations play a part in the way the Institute operates, the day-today operations are controlled by the Executive Secretary.

After the launch of the IIJ, the International Centre for Counter-Terrorism suggested in a press release that the focus of the IIJ wouldn't only be focused at improving governance within regions associated with terrorism, but would also work to strengthen criminal justice systems and also build regional judicial systems to improve local policing in areas of the world that had been previously neglected. In late 2014, the IIJ hosted a United Nations-based summit to discuss the role foreign terrorist fighters play in everyday society and what laws could be introduced.

The theme of IIJ's summits continued into 2015, when they held a roundtable meeting for lawmakers from North Africa, Europe and the Middle East. The roundtable discussed how they could implement support for senior lawmakers and government officials in the regions present. The policy was supported by the Counter-Terrorism Committee Executive Directorate (CTED), the project is implemented by the Global Center on Cooperative Security (Global Center) and the Institute for Security Studies (ISS).

The Valletta Recommendations Relating to Contributions by Parliamentarians in Developing an Effective Response to Terrorism was developed during workshops ran by the IIJ. The then Maltese Home Affairs Minister Carmelo Abela then addressed a two-day workshop in early 2017, discussing how terrorist groups such as ISIS needed to be stopped from spreading their propaganda on social media. Abela stated that he and the IIJ were working closely with Google, Facebook and Twitter on the matter.

References

External links 
Official website of The IIJ
2014 establishments in Malta
Organisations based in Valletta
Counterterrorism
International political organizations
International organizations based in Europe